Aarnikka is a Finnish surname. Notable people with the surname include:

 Mika Aarnikka (born 1967), Finnish sailor
 Tuomo Aarnikka (born 1967), Finnish wheelchair curler

Finnish-language surnames